Hurricane Carla triggered a destructive and deadly outbreak of 21 tornadoes in Alabama, Louisiana, Texas, Arkansas, and Michigan that occurred from September 10–13, 1961. A total of 11 tornadoes touched down in Louisiana, and eight more in Texas. This was the first of only two known violent tornadoes ever spawned by a hurricane with the other one happening during Hurricane Hilda in 1964. By the time it was over, the outbreak had killed 14 people, injured 337 others, and caused over $3.461 million in damage.

Meteorological synopsis

As Hurricane Carla moved northwestward over the Gulf of Mexico on September 10, its outer rainbands began to spread over the Gulf Coast. Favorable shear profiles led to scattered tornadoes touching down across the region, including an F3 tornado that caused numerous casualties in Kaplan, Louisiana. September 12 was the worst day of the outbreak with six significant (F2+) tornadoes touching down, including a violent F4 tornado in Galveston, Texas and an intense F3 tornado in Jonesboro, Louisiana, causing widespread destruction and 250 casualties. By September 13, a weaker Tropical Storm Carla was accelerating northward into Canada. Some scattered tornado activity occurred on this day before the outbreak came to an end.

Confirmed tornadoes

September 10 event

September 11 event

September 12 event

September 13 event

See also
 List of North American tornadoes and tornado outbreaks
 List of tornadoes spawned by tropical cyclones
 Hurricane Rita tornado outbreak

Notes

References

Carla
Tornadoes of 1961
F4 tornadoes
Tornadoes in Alabama
Tornadoes in Louisiana
Tornadoes in Texas
Tornadoes in Arkansas
Tornadoes in Michigan
Tornadoes in Georgia (U.S. state)